Ara Mina (born Hazel Pascual Reyes-Almarinez; May 9, 1979) is a Filipino actress, singer, endorser, and entrepreneur. Recognized as the "Millennium Goddess", Mina is a recipient of a FAMAS Award for Best Actress, 3 Golden Screen Awards including the 'Dekada Award' and an Asia's Golden Icons Award.

Career
Mina became part of the Philippine entertainment industry at 14 years of age via the youth-oriented program That's Entertainment, hosted and spearheaded by the late master showman German Moreno ("Kuya Germs"). Since then, Mina has starred in about 40 television shows and 60 movies and released 3 recording albums. She won her first acting award for Best Actress for the movie Mano Po at the Metro Manila Film Festival in 2002. The following year (2003), she received 3 more Best Actress awards from Manila Film Festival, FAMAS and Golden Screen Awards for the movie Ang Huling Birhen Sa Lupa. She also won the Golden Screen Awards and Star Awards in 2004 for Best Supporting Actress in a drama in the Philippines for her role as Luna in Minsan Pa.

Mina also sings aside from acting. Her self-titled and first album from Star Music (formerly Star records) which carried the hit song "Ay, Ay, Ay, Pag-Ibig" received a gold record award a few months after its release. Because of this, the record label decided to produce another album for her entitled "Heavenly", which was also a big hit and included the track "Oops Teka Lang" which was also the theme song of the movie of the same title starring Robin Padilla and Claudine Barretto from Star Cinema. Her version of the Rey Valera hit "Kung Kailangan Mo Ako" was also used as the theme song of the ABS-CBN miniseries Sa Sandaling Kailangan Mo Ako. In 2008, she produced her 3rd album which was released under Sony BMG. It consisted of acoustic covers of hit songs like "What Do We Mean To Each Other" by Sergio Mendes, "Somebody" by Depeche Mode, and "Very Special Love" by Maureen McGovern.

She truly showcased versatility by starring in television shows of different genres, from sitcoms to heavy drama. Super Klenk , her first television sitcom wherein she played a super heroine, showed her comic skills and agility. She was then included in the cast of "Bubble Gang", which was her longest stint for television. The character that she played in the TV series Mulawin, Vultra, is also remarkable. In 2007, she switched to freelance acting and transferred to ABS-CBN doing projects via Prinsesa ng Banyera and Ligaw na Bulaklak. She returned to GMA Network and did multiple teleseryes for over two years. From 2011-2016, she did stints with TV5 Network but was able to do shows with the Kapuso network through Teen Gen and Yesterday's Bride. Her most recent television stint was for GMA-7's Pinulot Ka Lang sa Lupa and was also part of the movie My Ex and Whys starring Enrique Gil and Liza Soberano. She staged a teleserye comeback on ABS-CBN in Araw Gabi after doing anthology roles with the channel.

Personal life
The eldest of 9 children, she grew up in Marikina with her mother, Francis Marie Klenk, and stepfather, Romeo Reyes. At 18, she met and was acknowledged by her biological father, Chuck Mathay, a formercongressman from Quezon City. Actress Cristine Reyes is her half-sister through her mother  while San Juan councilors Cris and Macky Mathay are her half-brothers.

Mina has one child with Bulakan mayor, Patrick Meneses.

On January 13, 2021, she got engaged to Dave Almarinez, CEO of the Philippine International Trading Corporation.

Mina supports children with birth defects through the Ara Mina Foundation, which she founded in 2007. Her youngest sister was born with Down syndrome, was the inspiration behind this cause.

Filmography

Television

Film

Awards

Discography
Ara Mina (Self-Titled) (1999, Star Music)
Heavenly (2001, Star Music)

References

External links

Ara Mina at iGMA.tv

1979 births
Living people
21st-century Filipino actresses
21st-century Filipino women singers
ABS-CBN personalities
Actresses from Manila
Filipino child actresses
Filipino female models
Filipino film actresses
Filipino television actresses
Filipino women comedians
GMA Network personalities
Star Music artists
That's Entertainment (Philippine TV series)
That's Entertainment Tuesday Group Members
TV5 (Philippine TV network) personalities
Viva Artists Agency